Tösse is a locality situated in Åmål Municipality, Västra Götaland County, Sweden with 305 inhabitants in 2010.

References 

Populated places in Västra Götaland County
Populated places in Åmål Municipality
Dalsland